Ardente was the name of at least two ships of the Italian Navy and may refer to:

 , an  launched in 1912 and discarded in 1937.
 , a  launched in 1942 and sunk in 1943.

Italian Navy ship names